Ørnulf Seippel (born 1962) is a Norwegian sociologist. He is currently a Researcher at Norwegian Social Research and Professor II at the Norwegian University of Science and Technology, where he was Professor of Sociology and Political Science from 2007 to 2009. He has published books and articles on sociology of sport, the environment and social movements.

Publications
The Fine Art of Coaching: Instructions, Social Support or Democratic Participation? European Journal for Sport and Society 2/2008
Sports in Civil Society: Networks, Social Capital and Influence. European Sociological Review 1/2008
Sport and Social Capital. Acta Sociologica 2/2006
The Meanings of Sport: Fun, Health, Beauty or Community?. Sport in Society. 1/2006
Norsk idrett: Organisasjon, fellesskap, politikk, 2005
Sport, Civil Society and Social Integration. Journal of Civil Society. 3/2005
The World According to Voluntary Sport Organizations: Voluntarism, Facilities and Economy. International Review for the Sociology of Sport 2/2004
Sosiale bevegelser: Innføring, oversikt, utfordringer. Sosiologisk tidsskrift 2/2003 
Integrating and Articulating Environments: A Challenge for Northern and Southern Europe., 2003
Idrettens bevegelser.  Sosiologiske studier av idrett i et moderne samfunn., 2002
Sports and Nationalism in a Globalized World. International Journal of Sociology 2017

References

Norwegian sociologists
Norwegian Social Research people
Living people
1962 births